The Salafist Call ( or (Ad-Da'wa As-Salafiya)) is a Salafi organization in Egypt that was established in 1984. It established the Nour Party in 2011, which won the second-highest number of seats in the 2011–2012 Egyptian parliamentary election. Yasser Borhamy is the vice president of the organization, while Mohamed Abdel Fattah Abu Idris is the president.

References

Islamic organisations based in Egypt
Salafi groups